Events in the year 1960 in Germany.

Incumbents
President – Heinrich Lübke 
Chancellor –  Konrad Adenauer

Events 
1 February - Germany in the Eurovision Song Contest 1960
24 June - 5 July - 10th Berlin International Film Festival

Births
5 January - Bettina Tietjen, German television presenter and talk show host
10 January - Claudia Losch, German shot putter
14 January - Andrea Fischer, German politician
3 February - Joachim Löw, German football coach
7 February
Klaus J. Behrendt, German actor
Kristin Otto, German swimmer
16 February - Frank-Markus Barwasser, German comedian and journalist
23 February - Gloria, Princess of Thurn and Taxis, German socialite, businesswoman and artist
24 March - Nena, German singer
25 March -  Markus Maria Profitlich, German comedian and actor
13 April - Rudi Völler, German football player
16 April - Pierre Littbarski, German football player
18 April - Neo Rauch, German artist
11 May - Jürgen Schult, German discus thrower
16 May - Tamme Hanken, German horse whisperer and animals bonesetter (died 2016)
7 June
Steffen Seibert, German journalist
Peter Limbourg, German journalist
1 August - Karl-Heinz Wiesemann, German bishop of Roman Catholic Church
8 August - Ralf König, German comic writer
14 September - Christian Petzold, German film director
18 September - Wolfgang Bahro, German actor
23 September - Barbara Mensing, German archer
27 September - Patrick Lindner, German singer
12 October - Dorothee Vieth, German Paralympic cyclist
17 October - Hartmut Weber, German athlete
24 October - Christoph Schlingensief, German theatre director, performance artist and filmmaker (died 2010)
29 October - Dieter Nuhr, German comedian
2 November - Andy Borg, German singer
4 November - Frl. Menke, German singer
15 November - Susanne Lothar, German actress (died 2012)
27 November - Eike Immel, German football player
2 December - Justus von Dohnányi, German actor
12 December
Volker Beck, German politician
Martina Hellmann, German track and field athlete
22 December - Felicitas Hoppe, German writer

Deaths

 4 January — Hugo Meurer, German admiral (born 1869)
 25 January — Beno Gutenberg, German-American seismologist (born 1889)
 27 January — Hans Schlossberger, German physician (born 1887)
 18 March — Hans Bischoff, German entomologist (born 1889)
 25 March - Ernst Melsheimer, German lawyer (born 1897)
 30 March - Fritz Klimsch, German sculptor (born 1870)
 20 April - Helmut Käutner, German film director (born 1908)
 24 April — Max von Laue, German physicist (born 1879)
 31 May — Walther Funk, German banker and economist (born 1890)
 13 June — Wilhelm Keppler, German businessman (born 1882)
 25 June — Walter Baade, German astronomer (born 1893)
 29 June — Victor Janson, German actor and film director (born 1884)
 2 July - Edmund Heckler German engineer & weapons manufacture (born 1906)
 3 July — Erwin Jaenecke, German general (born 1890)
 6 July — Hans Wilsdorf, German businessman and founder of Rolex (born 1881)
 16 July - Albert Kesselring, German Generalfeldmarshal of Luftwaffe (born 1885)
 24 July — Hans Albers, German actor (born 1891)
 23 August — Bruno Loerzer, German aviator and air force general (born 1891)
 7 September - Wilhelm Pieck, German politician (born 1876)
 8 October - Hermann Schmitz, German industrialist (born 1881)
 15 October — Henny Porten, German actress and producer (born 1890)
 5 November — Erich Neumann, German psychologist (born 1905)
 6 November - Erich Raeder, German admiral (born 1876)
 9 November — Ernst Wilhelm Bohle, German Nazi general (born 1903)
 2 December – Fritz August Breuhaus, German architect, interior designer and designer (born 1883)
 7 December - Walter Noddack, German chemist (born 1893)
 14 December - Hermine Körner, German actress (born 1878)
 28 December - Eduard Ludwig, German architect (born 1906)
 31 December - Joseph Wendel, German cardinal of Roman Catholic Church (born 1901)

See also
 1960 in German television

References

 
Years of the 20th century in Germany
Germany
Germany